Lectionary 336 (Gregory-Aland), designated by siglum ℓ 336 (in the Gregory-Aland numbering) is a Greek manuscript of the New Testament, on parchment. Palaeographically it has been assigned to the 14th century. The manuscript has not survived in complete condition.

Description 
The original codex contained lessons from the Matthew and Luke  (Evangelistarium) with lacunae on 178 parchment leaves. The leaves are measured.

The text is written in Greek minuscule letters, in two columns per page, 24 lines per page. It has musical notes.

The codex contains weekday Gospel lessons according to the Byzantine Church order.

History 

Scrivener dated the manuscript to the 13th-century, Gregory dated it to the 14th-century, other paleographers to the 11th or 12th-century. It is now assigned by the INTF to the 14th-century.

The manuscript was added to the list of New Testament manuscripts by Scrivener (284e) and Gregory (number 336e). Gregory saw it in 1883.

It used to be held in Blenheim (3. C. 13), but is now housed at the British Library (Add MS 31921) in London.

The fragment is not cited in critical editions of the Greek New Testament (UBS4, NA27).

See also 

 List of New Testament lectionaries
 Biblical manuscript
 Textual criticism
 Lectionary 335

References

Bibliography

External links 
 

Greek New Testament lectionaries
14th-century biblical manuscripts
British Library additional manuscripts